Romy P. Tiongco is a former Catholic priest and Christian Aid worker from the Philippines. 
During the 1970s he was a critic of the regime of Ferdinand Marcos. He later moved to the UK working in the NGO sector. He was Christian Aid North West regional co-ordinator. Together with his wife, Linda, he runs a UK registered charity MuCAARD which aims to bring Muslims and Christians together to tackle issues related to deforestation and sustainable forestry.
In 2007 he stood for and won election as mayor of Damulog in the Philippines, winning re-election in 2010.

Publications 
 White, Sarah C. and Tiongco, Romy (1997) Doing Theology and Development: Meeting the Challenge of Poverty, Edinburgh: Saint Andrew Press

References 

Filipino Roman Catholics
Living people
Filipino activists
Mayors of places in Bukidnon
People from Bukidnon
Year of birth missing (living people)